Superbowl may refer to:

 A misspelling of Super Bowl, U.S. American football championship game of the NFL
 Superbowl of Debate is a program by the University of Louisville Debate Society to increase minority participation in debate
 Superbowl of Wrestling held in the 1970s
 Super Bowl of Poker held in the 1980s
 The championship game of the Italian Football League was known as the Superbowl italiano until 2014
 A performance venue at the Sun City resort located in South Africa
 The Super Dave Superbowl of Knowledge, a 1994 TV special by Super Dave Osborne

See also

 super cup
 Super League (disambiguation)